After China is a 1992 novel by Australian novelist Brian Castro.

Plot summary

Mr You, an ex-patriate Chinese architect, has designed a strange labyrinthine hotel overlooking the ocean. While holidaying in the completed structure he meets a woman on a beach who is dying of cancer.  He finds himself drawn to the woman and spins her tales of an ancient China that never existed.

Reviews
 The Canberra Times

Awards and nominations

 1993 winner Victorian Premier's Literary Awards — The Vance Palmer Prize for Fiction 
 1993 shortlisted NBC Banjo Awards — NBC Banjo Award for Fiction 
 1993 shortlisted Miles Franklin Award

References 

1992 Australian novels